Michael Barbieri may refer to:
 Michael Barbieri (politician)
 Michael Barbieri (actor)